RailBlazer is a steel roller coaster at California's Great America in Santa Clara, California. Manufactured by Rocky Mountain Construction, the single-rail roller coaster opened in June 2018. RailBlazer is the ninth roller coaster at California's Great America, and features a 90-degree drop, three inversions, and an off-roading adventure theme. 

RailBlazer was one of two prototype single-rail coasters to open in 2018, the other being the Wonder Woman Golden Lasso Coaster at Six Flags Fiesta Texas, whose layout is a mirror image of RailBlazer's.

History
California's Great America announced RailBlazer on August 16, 2017, and accompanied it with an official groundbreaking ceremony. On the same day, the park released a simulated POV of the roller coaster. RailBlazer opened to passholders on June 9, 2018, and opened to the public 5 days later.

Ride experience

The train then rises up to the right into an off-axis airtime hill, followed by a right-facing upwards helix. After the helix, the train makes a left turn and quickly drops, entering a right-facing cutback and a corkscrew. Finally, riders go through an over-banked turn to the left before hitting the brake run.

Characteristics
The roller coaster is themed to California State Route 1. It is meant to reflect an off-road adventure around the San Francisco Bay Area and California central coast. Multiple large rocks surround the ride, as well as a pool of water, which the queue interacts with. The trains are also built to resemble all-terrain vehicles (ATVs) with handlebars, grille, headlights and bumper.

References

External links
 

Single-rail roller coasters
Roller coasters in California
Roller coasters operated by Cedar Fair